Auseklis Ozols (born September 22, 1941) is a Latvian-born American artist and professor based in New Orleans. Ozols has been active in the fields of oil painting, watercolor painting, ink, and photography.

Biography 
Auseklis Ozols was born in Strenci, Latvia in 1941. He moved to the U.S. with his family in 1950. Ozols graduated in 1961 from the Trenton School of Industrial Arts. In 1965, Ozols went on to earn a Bachelor of Fine Arts from the University of Pennsylvania and the Pennsylvania Academy of Fine Arts, before receiving a Master of Fine Arts in 1969 from Temple University.

Ozols moved to New Orleans in 1970, where he married Gwendolyn Laan; they had three daughters. Gwendolyn Laan Ozols died in 1980.

Inspired by Thomas Eakins and the Pennsylvania Academy of Fine Arts, Ozols founded the New Orleans Academy of Fine Arts in 1978. Ozols also designed The Academy Gallery, located inside the New Orleans Academy of Fine Arts. The school is still in operation today.

Ozols’ works have been included in public and private collections internationally. In New Orleans, he has received the Delgado Award from the New Orleans Museum of Art, the Strength in Age Award, and the Community Arts Award from the Arts Council of New Orleans. His works have been displayed at the Louisiana Governor's Mansion, the New Orleans Museum of Art, the New Jersey State Museum, and the Latvian Museum of Art in Riga, Latvia.

Ozols lost the sight of his right eye in 2012, but continues to paint and teach. He retired from his work with the New Orleans Academy in 2020. 
Noteworthy students of Ozols include Kate Samworth and Matt Rinard.

Further reading

 Auseklis Ozols: The Romantic Realism of an Artist, text by John R Kemp (Pelican Publishing, 2018)
 Expressions of Place: The Contemporary Louisiana Landscape, by John R Kemp (2016)
 A Unique Slant of Light: The Bicentennial History of Art in Louisiana, eds. Michael Sartisky, J. Richard Gruber, and John R. Kemp (2012)
 The Majesty of St Charles Avenue (2001)
 Article in American Artist magazine, June 1993
 Oil Highlights Still Life Magazine, An American Artist Publication, Collector Series, January 1997

External links
 New Orleans Academy of Fine Art
 Article about Auseklis Ozols at online magazine 64 Parishes
 Article about mural by Ozols
 Work by Ozols: Demar’s New Dawn
 Arts Council of New Orleans 2009 Community Arts Awards
 Mural by Ozols
 Audio interview
 Article about Ozols in New Orleans Art Review
 Announcement of lecture by Ozols
 Archive of artist page

1941 births
Living people
20th-century American painters
American male painters
21st-century American painters
Artists from New Orleans
Latvian World War II refugees
Latvian emigrants to the United States
20th-century American male artists